Gilles Brassard,  is a faculty member of the Université de Montréal, where he has been a Full Professor since 1988 and Canada Research Chair since 2001.

Education and early life
Brassard received a Ph.D. in Computer Science from Cornell University in 1979, working in the field of cryptography with John Hopcroft as his advisor.

Research
Brassard is best known for his fundamental work in quantum cryptography, quantum teleportation, quantum entanglement distillation, quantum pseudo-telepathy, and the classical simulation of quantum entanglement. Some of these concepts have been implemented in the laboratory.

In 1984, together with Charles H. Bennett, he invented the BB84 protocol for quantum cryptography. He later extended this work to include the Cascade error correction protocol, which performs efficient detection and correction of noise caused by eavesdropping on quantum cryptographic signals.

Awards and honours
Brassard was the editor-in-chief of the Journal of Cryptology from 1991 to 1998. In 2000, he won the Prix Marie-Victorin, the highest scientific award of the government of Quebec. He was elected as a Fellow of the International Association for Cryptologic Research in 2006, the first Canadian to be so honored. In June 2010, he was awarded the Gerhard Herzberg Canada Gold Medal, Canada's highest scientific honour. Brassard was elected a Fellow of the Royal Society of Canada and the Royal Society of London (2013). His nomination reads:  On December 30, 2013, the Governor-General of Canada, the Right Honourable David Johnston, announced that Gilles Brassard has been named as an Officer in the Order Of Canada. In 2018 he received the Wolf Prize in Physics and in 2019 the BBVA Foundation Frontiers of Knowledge Award in Basic Sciences. as well as the Micius Quantum Prize.

In September 2022, Brassard was awarded the Breakthrough Prize in fundamental physics, the world’s largest science prize.

References

1955 births
Living people
Canadian computer scientists
Modern cryptographers
Academics from Montreal
Université de Montréal alumni
Cornell University College of Engineering alumni
Canada Research Chairs
Fellows of the Royal Society of Canada
Canadian Fellows of the Royal Society
Officers of the Order of Canada
International Association for Cryptologic Research fellows
Officers of the National Order of Quebec
Quantum information scientists
Scientists from Montreal
Wolf Prize in Physics laureates